Birla Vidya Mandir in Nainital is a residential public school for boys in India which was founded in July 1947. The school is the product of the vision of Govind Ballabh Pant, an Indian independence activist.

It was built in the 1870s as Oak Openings High School and the naturalist and story teller Jim Corbett studied at it. In 1905, Oak Openings was amalgamated with the Philander Smith Institute of Mussoorie, resulting in the Philander Smith College. In the wake of the Second World War, Hallett War School was built on the same campus, established for the children of the British who were in India at that time due to the war.

Birla Vidya Mandir came into existence in 1947, when Shree G. D. Birla bought the estate.

Before India achieved its independence, Pant wanted to start a public school; a donation from Ghanshyam Das Birla, a philanthropist and industrialist, made this possible. Pant then used the estate of Philander Smith, which had housed the Hallett War School during India's war years, to create Birla Vidya Mandir.

The school takes admissions from Class 4 to Class 12. Though an English medium school, the ethos is totally Indian. Prayers in Sanskrit are held before every meal and students celebrate the festivals of India.

The school is affiliated to CBSE Delhi and is a member of Indian Public School's Conference (IPSC), National Progressive Schools' Conference(NPSC), CBSE Sahodaya School Complex and International Confederation of Principals (ICP).

The school is an ISO 9002:2000(E) (Quality Management System) and ISO:14001:1996 (Environmental Management System) certified institution.

The school is 330 km to the northeast of Delhi in the Central Himalayan township of Nainital. It is connected by a motorable road.

History
The estate was first owned by J.W. Waugh, and it was close to where the GB Pant Hospital (Ramsay Hospital) now stands.

"Situated just below the summit of Sher-ka-danda, the most easterly of the peaks surrounding Nainital and just above St Asaph Road", writes Martin Booth, "it commanded a stunning panoramic view of the town, the tal and the drop to the plains of India". The much expanded Birla Vidya Mandir stands in the hoary campus of the Oak Opening High School the vestiges of which still survive in the guise of much renovated Gandhi House and in all probability the Administrative Block and Library, described by Martin Booth as “Jim's original school surviving as a house close to the main building".

Jim Corbett, the famous naturalist and story teller from Nainital, attended Oak Openings School. Some of the Jim's biographers speak of the school being operated and co-owned by a ruthless and cruel ex-Indian Army Officer who was known to his 70 pupils as 'Dead Eye Dick' "for his aim both with a rifle and a bamboo cane was exceedingly accurate". It became a favourite memory of Jim's, in his later years, to remark how Oak Openings was the site of the shooting of the last mountain quail (Ophrysia supercilosa) in 1876, driving it into extinction.

In 1905, the Philander Smith Institute of Mussoorie, founded by Mrs. Smith, widow of Mr. Philander Smith of Illinois, was moved to Nainital and "amalgamated" with the Oak Opening Boys' High School. The result was the Philander Smith College with Rev. FS Ditto as its first principal. Describing the development and expansion of Philander Smith College, Deputy Commissioner of Nainital JM Clay wrote in his monograph (Nainital, A Historical and Descriptive Account, 1927) that "The extensive buildings which now exist have been built gradually since then, and a large dormitory block has recently been constructed. The site is over 7,500 feet above sea-level and is the highest school site in India, probably in the world". Here the building being referred to is the imposing 'Ashok Bhavan' then called the 'Hurricane House.' Incidentally, Orde Wingate of Chindit Circus fame, who was born on 26 February 1903 in a house called Montrose in Nainital, had his early schooling in all probability at Philander Smith College. Despite their birthplace being the same, Jim never met the "sword and Bible" general Wingate. However, as a Lieutenant Colonel and senior instructor in jungle craft, he trained some of Orde Wingate's 'Chindits' at Chhindwara in the then Central Province.

An article by AG Atkins, the pastor of the Union Church for two summers at Nainital and better known for his translation of Ram Charit Manas, published in the Hindustan Times Sunday Magazine on 14 August 1956 says that Jim and his sister Maggie were the most awaited guests at the Philander Smith College and its sister institution the Wellesley (now the DSB College of the Kumaun University). Installing Maggie on the dais in the central hall of what now is known as Gandhi House he would lecture on his favourite subject, the Jungle Telegraph. "A tiger is coming, he would announce, and then mimic a series of bird calls: the jungle babbler, drongo, peafowl, etc. One evening after Corbett had screened his first tiger film and given his wildlife lecture at Philander Smith College, the pastor walked Corbett half way home to the lake from the college. After sometime the priest asked him what made a hunter a photographer, and the response of Jim as records Atkins was "It required much more of my skill and gives me an even greater thrill to get good pictures of my animals than when I used to hunt just to kill".

References

External links
 Official website
 BVM, Through the corridor of Time – History of the school

Boys' schools in India
Private schools in Uttarakhand
High schools and secondary schools in Uttarakhand
Boarding schools in Uttarakhand
Education in Nainital
Educational institutions established in 1947
1947 establishments in India